Dr. C Channa Reddy (born 1948) is an Indian origin distinguished professor Emeritus and Director at the Huck Institute of Life Sciences and Head of the Department of Veterinary and Biomedical sciences at the Pennsylvania State University.

Education 
Reddy obtained his PhD in Biochemistry from the Indian Institute of Science, Bangalore, in 1975. Earlier he did his master's degree in Bio Chemistry from University of Mysore, India.

Reddy later did his Post Doctoral in Bio-Organic Chemistry at Penn State University, the US, in 1979.

Career and research
Reddy started his career as a research associate at the center for Air Environmental Studies, the Pennsylvania State University, from 1979 to 1982. From 1982 to 1990, he worked as a professor of Veterinary Science at Pen State University.

From 1991 to the present, he has been working as a Distinguished Professor at the college of agricultural sciences at the Pennsylvania State University.

Reddy's major research during the last 25 years is in the area of molecular aspects of biological oxidation reactions.

Books 
Reddy wrote the book on Biological Oxidation Systems volume 1 and volume 2 with the help of other editors, which was published in the year 1990 by Academic Press.

Reddy wrote the book on Biological Oxidation Systems volume 1, which was published in 2012 by Elsevier Science.

Awards 
Reddy was awarded a Research Career Development Award (RCDA) from NIH in 1983 to 1988.

Reddy was honored as an "Eminent scientist of Telugu origin: during the Platinum Jubilee celebrations of Osmania University, Hyderabad, in 1993.

References 

1948 births
Living people